Mujibul Hussain (born 4 April 2002) is a Bangladeshi cricketer. He made his List A debut for Bangladesh Krira Shikkha Protishtan in the 2018–19 Dhaka Premier Division Cricket League on 21 April 2019.

References

External links
 

2002 births
Living people
Bangladeshi cricketers
Bangladesh Krira Shikkha Protishtan cricketers
People from Habiganj District